Harry Goode may refer to:

 Harry H. Goode (1909–1960), American computer engineer and systems engineer
 Harry King Goode (1892–1942), World War I flying ace
 Harry C. Goode Jr. (1938–2013), former mayor of Melbourne, Florida